Notiothemis jonesi,  eastern forestwatcher, Jones’ forestwatcher or eastern elf, is a species of dragonfly in the family Libellulidae. It is found from South Africa to Kenya, Uganda, Malawi and Zambia (including Zimbabwe, Mozambique and Tanzania). Its natural habitats include pools and swamps in subtropical or tropical forests; absent from lowlands.

References

External links

 Notiothemis jonesi on African Dragonflies and Damselflies Online

Libellulidae
Insects described in 1919
Taxa named by Friedrich Ris
Taxonomy articles created by Polbot